The 1987 ICF Canoe Sprint World Championships were held in Duisburg, West Germany for the second time. The West German city hosted the championships previously in 1979.

The men's competition consisted of six Canadian (single paddle, open boat) and nine kayak events. Three events were held for the women, all in kayak.

This was the 21st championships in canoe sprint.

Medal summary

Men's

Canoe

Kayak

Women's

Kayak

Medals table

References
 
 
 

Icf Canoe Sprint World Championships, 1987
Icf Canoe Sprint World Championships, 1987
ICF Canoe Sprint World Championships
Canoe
Canoeing and kayaking competitions in Germany